54th CAS Awards
February 24, 2018

Motion Picture – Live Action:

Dunkirk

Motion Picture – Animated:

Coco

Motion Picture – Documentary:

Jane

The 54th Cinema Audio Society Awards will be held on February 24, 2018, in the Bunker Hill Ballroom of the OMNI Los Angeles Hotel at California Plaza, Los Angeles, honoring outstanding achievements in sound mixing in film and television of 2017.



Winners and nominees

References

2017 film awards
2017 television awards
Cinema Audio Society Awards
2017 in American cinema
2017 guild awards